Raped by an Angel a.k.a. Naked Killer 2 (香港奇案之強姦; pinyin: Xiang Gang qi an zhi qiang jian) is a 1993 Category III Hong Kong film directed by Andrew Lau, with a scenario by Wong Jing. The Hong Kong Chinese actor Mark Cheng is shown naked in the film, as he walks around a room, with his genitals briefly shown on screen.

Prequel and sequel
Alternatively titled Naked Killer 2 a.k.a. "Legal Rape" a.k.a. "Super Rape", the movie is a semi-sequel to the 1992 Naked Killer, directed by Clarence Fok Yiu-leung. In fact, the main link between the two films is the reunion of Simon Yam and Chingmy Yau, who play different roles. It was followed by four other movies:
 Raped by an Angel 2: The Uniform Fan (1998), directed by Aman Chang
 Raped by an Angel 3: Sexual Fantasy of the Chief Executive (1998), directed by Aman Chang
 Raped by an Angel 4: The Raper's Union (1999), directed by Wong Jing
 Raped by an Angel 5: The Final Judgement (2000), directed by Billy Tang Hin-Shing

Raped by an Angel 1, 3 and 4 are rated Category III, while 2 and 5 are rated Category IIB.

Cast and roles
 Dennis Chan – Professor Chan
 Mark Cheng – Chuck Chi-shing
 Linda Cheung – Girl in Opening Sequence
 Nick Cheung		
 Lee Siu-Kei		
 Jacqueline Ng – Chu Kit-Man
 Simon Yam – Tso Tat Wah
 Chingmy Yau – Yau Yuk-nam
 Yuen King-Tan – Turkey

References

External links
 
 lovehkfilm entry
 hkcinemagic entry

1993 films
Hong Kong crime thriller films
1990s Cantonese-language films
Sexploitation films
Rape and revenge films
1993 crime thriller films
Films directed by Andrew Lau
1990s Hong Kong films